Oxylides is a genus of butterflies in the family Lycaenidae. The members are Afrotropical. The genus was erected by Jacob Hübner c. 1819

Species
Oxylides albata (Aurivillius, 1895)
Oxylides bella Aurivillius, 1899
Oxylides binza Berger, 1981
Oxylides faunus (Drury, [1773])
Oxylides feminina (Sharpe, 1904)
Oxylides gloveri Hawker-Smith, 1929
Oxylides stempfferi Berger, 1981

References

Seitz, A. Die Gross-Schmetterlinge der Erde 13: Die Afrikanischen Tagfalter. Plate XIII 67

Theclinae
Lycaenidae genera
Taxa named by Jacob Hübner